Benjamin Gorka (born 15 April 1984) is a German footballer who last played for SV Darmstadt 98 in the Bundesliga.

References

External links

1984 births
Living people
German footballers
SV Eintracht Trier 05 players
SV Darmstadt 98 players
SV Sandhausen players
Hamburger SV II players
SV Wacker Burghausen players
VfL Osnabrück players
VfR Aalen players
SG Sonnenhof Großaspach players
Bundesliga players
2. Bundesliga players
3. Liga players
Association football central defenders
Footballers from Mannheim